Choe Yeong-kyeong (최영경, 崔永慶, 1529–1590) was a scholar-official of the Joseon period of Korea. His pen name was Suwudang 수우당. His courtesy name was Hyowon 효원. He was a Westerner, and was killed as a result of the 1589 Gichuk Oksa.
In 1611 (3rd year of Gwanghae-gun), he was honored at Deokcheonseowon in Sancheong.

References

1529 births
1590 deaths